William Green (9 October 1927 – 1996) was an English footballer, who played as a defender.

Career

Green came up through the Wolverhampton Wanderers youth team, however did not make a senior appearance with the club. He would move to Walsall in 1949.

At Walsall, however, he would secure a first team spot, being an ever-present in two consecutive seasons for the club and making a total of 180 appearances.

In 1954 he would move to Wrexham spending three years at the club. Whilst there, in a match with Gateshead on 22 December 1956, where, during an altercation with Gateshead forward Bill Brown, he was punched unconscious by Brown. Green did not remember what had happened in a post-match interview.

He left Wrexham in 1957, going on to play for Wellington Town, Caernarfon Town and Pwllheli.

Green died in 1996.

References

1927 births
1996 deaths
English footballers
English Football League players
Wolverhampton Wanderers F.C. players
Walsall F.C. players
Wrexham A.F.C. players
Telford United F.C. players
Caernarfon Town F.C. players
Pwllheli F.C. players
Association football defenders